Villa del Rosario is a city in the northeast of the province of Entre Ríos, Argentina. It lies about 9 km from the western banks of the Uruguay River near the mouth of the Mocoretá River and the reservoir of the Salto Grande Dam, and 23 km north of Federación.

References

 

Populated places in Entre Ríos Province